Riobamba Canton is one of ten cantons of the Chimborazo Province in Ecuador. Its population at the 2010 census was 225,741. Its capital is the town of Riobamba.

Subdivision 
The canton is divided into 16 parishes, five urban parishes, Lizarzaburu, Maldonado, Velasco, Veloz and Yaruquíes, and eleven rural parishes: Cacha, Calpi, Cubijíes, Flores, Licán, Licto, Pungalá, Punín, Químiag, San Juan and San Luís.

References

External links 
 www.codeso.com / Map of Chimborazo Province

 
Cantons of Chimborazo Province